Miroslaw Rzepa (born 27 December 1968) is a Polish former professional footballer who last played for Zawisza Bydgoszcz as a defender.

Having started his career at the club, he went on to feature for Falcon Pniewy and Amica Wronki before his first return to Zawisca Bydgoszcz. Rzepa later represented Odra / Varta Opole, Oder Opole,  Columbus Crew, Stomil Olsztyn, LKS Gomunice, Sparta Brodnica and Zawisza / Chemik Bydgoszcz. He returned to Zawisza Bydgoszcz to end his career.

He made a single appearance for the Poland national team in 1992.

Club career

Poland 
In 1986, Rzepa joined Zawisza Bydgoszcz and spent eight years at the club. In 1994, he spent a season at Falcon Pniewy before joining Amica Wronki for a two year spell. In 1997, he returned to Zawisza Bydgoszcz before lining-up for Odra / Varta Opole and Oder Opole.

Columbus Crew 
In 2000, Rzepa signed for MLS club Columbus Crew. He made five appearances for the club.

Return to Poland 
Rzepa returned to Poland and joined Stomil Olsztyn before the turn of the year. He played for both LKS Gomunice and Sparta Brodnica during the following season, before a move to Zawisza / Chemik Bydgoszcz in 2002. Rzepa spent the final two years of his career at his boyhood club, Zawisza Bydgoszcz.

References 

1968 births
Living people
Polish footballers
Association football defenders
Columbus Crew players
Major League Soccer players
Polish expatriate footballers
Sportspeople from Bydgoszcz
Zawisza Bydgoszcz players
Amica Wronki players
OKS Stomil Olsztyn players
Sparta Brodnica players
Poland international footballers